Regional 2 South Central is a level six league in the English rugby union system, one of twelve leagues, at this level. The twelve teams are based in Berkshire, Buckinghamshire, Gloucestershire, Oxfordshire, Warwickshire, Wiltshire and Hampshire. The clubs finishing in the first two places are automatically promoted to a Regional 1 league.

Teams 2022–23
Buckingham
Devizes
Grove
Marlborough
Newbury Blues
Reading
Salisbury
Shipston on Stour
Stow-on-the-Wold
Swindon
Tottonians
Witney

References

6
 
 
 
 
 
Sports leagues established in 2022